The Eleventh All-Ukrainian Congress of Soviets was a congress of  Soviets (councils) of workers, peasants, Red-army-men deputies that took place in Kharkiv on May 7 - 15, 1929.

Composition
There were 1333 delegates out which 893 had the right to vote. Among the delegates there were 937 Communists.

Agenda
 Report of government of the Ukrainian SSR
 Report of government of the Soviet Union
 Report about the Five-Year plan development of national economy of Ukraine
 Adoption of the Constitution of the Ukrainian SSR
 Report on situation and perspectives on culture development
 Others

Decisions
 Completely approved the work of government of the Ukrainian SSR (Chubar Government) and the Soviet Union
 including measures in regards to industrialization of the country, 
 noted great achievements in development of industry.

 Reviewed and approved the Five-Year plan development of national economy of Ukraine
 Unanimously adopted the Constitution of the Ukrainian SSR in new edition that reflected significant changes which occurred in the republic since the time of adoption of the 1919 Constitution of the Ukrainian SSR and were caused by creation of the Soviet Union

It elected the new All-Ukrainian Central Executive Committee consisting of 315 members and 110 candidates as well as representatives of the Ukrainian SSR to the Council of Nationalities of the Central Executive Committee of the Soviet Union including 5 members and 2 candidates.

External links
The Eleventh All-Ukrainian Congress of Soviets. Ukrainian Soviet Encyclopedia

11
Political history of Ukraine
1929 in Ukraine
History of Kharkiv
1929 in politics
Communism in Ukraine
1929 conferences